Nikoline Nielsen may refer to:

 Nikoline Nielsen (businesswoman) (1874–1951), Danish businesswoman
 Nikoline Nielsen (handballer) (born 1987), Danish handballer